Elizabeth Odilile Ofili (born 1956) is a Nigerian-American physician and cardiology researcher. She was the first woman to become president of the Association of Black Cardiologists.

Early life and education 
Ofili was born and raised in Nigeria, and attended Ahmadu Bello University for medical school. She moved to the United States in 1982 and earned a master's of public health from Johns Hopkins University in 1983. She completed her postgraduate education in Tulsa, Oklahoma.

Career and research 
Ofili began her career with research at Oral Roberts University in Tulsa, and continued her cardiology research while a professor at Washington University in St. Louis. In 1994, she became an associate professor at Morehouse School of Medicine, and was promoted to full professor in 1999. Her research focuses on heart disease in the African-American population, dyslipidemia, hypertension, coronary artery disease, heart failure, and echocardiography; her work in the African American Heart Failure Trial substantially changed guidelines on heart failure treatment for African-Americans. She has also conducted research with NASA into the effects of microgravity on vasculature. She is acclaimed for her studies of myocardial blood flow.

Honors and awards 
 Young Investigator Research Award, American Society of Echocardiography and Mallinckrodt Cardiology (1993)
 Top 25 Black Female Doctors, Heart and Soul (1997) 
 Center of Clinical Research Excellence Award, National Institutes of Health (1999)
 President, Association of Black Cardiologists (2000-2002) 
 Nannette K. Wenger Award for Health Policy, National Institutes of Health (2001)
 Council of Dean Fellow, Association of American Medical Colleges (2007)
 Elected Member, Association of University Cardiologists (2013)
 Board of Trustees, Educational Commission for Foreign Medical Graduates
 Board of Trustees, Pfizer Women's Health Initiative
 Daniel Savage Memorial Science Award, Association of Black Cardiologists
 Board of Directors, National Space Biomedical Research Institute
 Advisory Board, National Clinical Center

References 

American cardiologists
21st-century American women physicians
21st-century American physicians
African-American physicians
Women cardiologists
Nigerian emigrants to the United States
Ahmadu Bello University alumni
Johns Hopkins University alumni
Washington University in St. Louis faculty
1956 births
Living people
Place of birth missing (living people)
African-American women physicians
Members of the National Academy of Medicine